Public budgeting is a field of public administration and a discipline in the academic study thereof.  Budgeting is characterized by its approaches, functions, formation, and type.

Authors Robert W. Smith and Thomas D. Lynch describe public budgeting through four perspectives. The politician sees the budget process as "a political event conducted in the political arena for political advantage". The economist views budgeting as a matter of allocating resources in terms of opportunity cost where allocating resources to one consumer takes resources away from another consumer.  The role of the economist, therefore, is to provide decision makers with the best possible information.  The accountant perspective focuses on the accountability value in budgeting which analyzes the amount budgeted to the actual expenditures thereby describing the "wisdom of the original policy".  Smith and Lynch's public manager's perspective on a budget is a policy tool to describe the implementation of public policy.  Further, they develop an operational definition:
A "budget" is a plan for the accomplishment of programs related to objectives and goals within a definite time period, including an estimate of resources required, together with an estimate of resources available, usually compared with one or more past periods and showing future requirements.

Differences between public and private budgeting 
Resource Management:

Public budgets are of a greater size, however, the responsibility for them is assigned to relatively small number of executive representatives. Authors Robert D. Lee. Jr. et al. argue that governments do not use all available resources, even though this has been violated in the United States during times of major crises such as World War II. On the other hand, they suggests that during times unaffected by the crisis most of the Gross domestic product is managed by the private sector. Governments have almost unlimited power to decide how much money will be used for public purposes, whereas private sector is reliable on their ability to sell their product on the market.

Profit Motive:

Private sector motivation is driven by profit. It is a form of evaluating success of the private subject. The success of government cannot be measured in terms of profit because most of the activities managed by the government are unprofitable. Although, there are some government activities that yield profit which cannot be always measured in terms of money, even though we realize there is an existing benefit to such programs. Authors Robert D. Lee. Jr. et al. provide an example of cancer research. It obviously yields great returns which cannot be directly measured in terms of money. Although, future earnings can be estimated according to the value of life. That is why more abstract terms of measuring results of governmental activities are preferable.

Role of public budgeting

Public Goods 
Authors Robert D. Lee. Jr. et al. say that:

"Some government services yield public or collective benefits that are of value to society as a whole"

They suggest that this is the main difference from corporate products that are mostly consumed by an individual. Public goods have two main properties that indicate them.

Nonexcludability - no one cannot be denied from using them (for an example public lighting)

nonrivalness - consumption of the public good from one person does not affect other person's use (everyone consumes national defence in the same way)

Public goods are also referred to as goods that cannot be provided by the market efficiently or will not be provided at all. This idea was originally presented by Paul Samuelson.

Externalities 
It is an effect that affects people beyond those who are targets of a particular service. Managing different externalities is also a domain where governments interfere.

 positive externalities - One of the most typical examples is education. Governments provide access to some level of education regardless of their wealth. Although this service is provided to a particular person the overall effect benefits the whole society.
 negative externalities - Some companies may pollute the environment, while they are maximizing their profit. It is the role of the government to prevent or minimize the cost arising from such actions.

Other responsibilities 

 Demographic changes - governments influence demographic factors through public programs
 High-risk situations - governments are able to bear or regulate risks connected to activities that would not be manageable for the private sector (such as space exploration)
 Technological change - governments help with providing infrastructure for new means of transport, they also regulate industries to prevent monopolies and other market instabilities

Examples of public goods 

 education
 infrastructure (roads, bridges, telecommunication, water supply, heat, electricity, public lighting)
 research and development
 healthcare
 judiciary
 pensions

Public budget revenues 
Governments are to redistribute money in a socially beneficial way. In order to do so they need to raise the money from people in the most efficient and equitable manner or incorporate some profitable activities. However, most of the revenues are accumulated from taxes and social insurances. Finding the balance between income and expenditures is the goal in public budgeting but the specific income sources and services provided are equally important topic in the discussion about public budgeting.

The main sources of federal income in the USA are individual income tax, social insurance taxes (payroll tax for Social Security and Medicare) and the last big income stream was the corporate income tax.

The aim of the government is to minimize the dead weight loss of taxation and tax evasion. This can be done in many ways, although some tax costs cannot be avoided completely.

Public budget expenditures 
Basically, there are two types of spendings:

Discretionary spendings - spendings that undergo an approval process which aims to modify the properties of those expenditures and can be changed each year, these can be operations of federal departments or investments in infrastructure, etc.. Discretionary spendings are consisting from the half out of national defence expenses in the USA.

Mandatory spending - government is obligated to pay them according to law no changes are allowed

Mandatory spendings became higher overtime and are the greater part of public expenditures. Most of them are closely connected to healthcare.

Net interest - means the amount of money government has to pay each year on interests on the national debt

There has been a huge shift towards mandatory spendings as countries around the world adopted various fiscal rules to enforce sustainability and to make public budgets more predictable over time . On the other hand, this implies that governments have much less space to control the public budget. Fiscal rules can have positive or negative outcomes according to the responsibility of the government. For governments that consume rising shares of national income these rules may prevent enormous debt of the country during their governance.

Allen Schick suggests that most of the developed countries went through tree stages of public budgeting scenarios.

Balanced budget norm - governments focused on balanced budget, each year they targeted the revenue expenditure balance but did not differentiate between recession and years of economic growth, because most of the countries could not follow this norm during times of war and economic stagnation these rules have been constantly violated, even though it served as a rigid argument for cutting expenses

Dynamic fiscal management - after the World War II. these rules shifted towards targeting balanced budget in the time horizon of one economic cycle, in some countries this meant that spendings should not exceed the government revenue that would be accumulated at full employment, the aim was to have an approximately same real output as the potential output

Fiscal targets - with the demand for balancing the economy rather than balancing the budget, governments used debt with the aim to stimulate the economy, after the oil shocks the governments could not balance out the budget by raising taxes and had to adapt much stronger cuts on expenditures, as balanced budgets are not possible during economic fluctuations, governments are now focusing on long-term prospects perceiving the debts as a drag on the future economic growth

Leading definitions
 Practical: "A plan for financing an enterprise or government during a definite period, which is prepared and submitted by a responsible executive to a representative body (or other duly constituted agent) whose approval and authorization are necessary before the plan may be executed." ~Frederick A. Cleveland  
 Theoretical: The leading question: "On what basis shall it be decided to allocate x dollars to activity A instead of activity B?" ~V. O. Key Jr.

Leading theorists and contributions
 Frederick Cleveland: constructed a practical definition of budgeting.
 William F. Willoughby: describes the purpose of a budget document.
 V. O. Key, Jr.: sparked the normative question regarding how scarce resources ought to be distributed to unlimited demands.
 Verne B. Lewis: argued for a budgeting theory based on economic values; strongly contributing to the study of public finance.
 Richard A. Musgrave: the Father of Public Finance; identified the three roles of government in the economy: allocation of resources, distribution of goods and services, and economy stabilization.
 Aaron Wildavsky:suggested that budgetary decision making is largely political, rather than based on economic conditions.
 Allen Schick: outlined the three functions of budgeting:
 Strategic Planning; deciding on the goals and objectives of an organization.
 Management Control; management's process of assuring effective and efficient accomplishment of goals and objectives laid out via strategic planning.
 Operational Control; focused on proper execution of specific tasks that provide the most efficient and effective means of meeting the goals and objectives ordered by management control.

 Irene S. Rubin: facilitated the discussion of the dichotomy between theory and practice of public budgeting.

Approaches to budgeting
A brief note on Systems Theory applied to Political Science: Inputs enter the governmental system that produces outputs which—in turn—are related to outcomes. The conversion of inputs to outputs is a measure of efficiency as the measurement of contributing inputs to impacting outcomes is a measure of efficacy.
 Line Item Budgeting is arguably the simplest form of budgeting, this approach links the inputs of the system to the system. These budgets typically appear in the form of accounting documents that express minimal information regarding purpose or an explicit object within the system.
 Program Budgeting takes a normative approach to budgeting in that decision making—allocating resources—is determined by the funding of one program instead of another based on what that program offers. This approach quickly lends itself to the PPBS budgeting approach.
 PPBS Budgeting or—Program Planning Budgeting System—is the link between the line-item and program budgets and the more complex performance budget. As opposed to the more simple program budget, this decision making tool links the program under consideration to the ways and means of facilitating the program. This is meant to serve as a long-term planning tool so that decision makers are made aware of the future implications of their actions. These are typically most useful in capital projects. The planning portion of the approach seeks to link goals to objects or expected outcomes from specific outputs, which are then sorted into programs that convert inputs to outputs; finally, the budgeting of PPBS helps determine how to fund the program. A leader in the promotion of PPBS was Robert McNamara's use in the United States Government's Department of Defense in the 1960s.
 Performance Based Budgeting attempts to solve decision making problems based on a programs ability to convert inputs to outputs and/or use inputs to affect certain outcomes. whatever Performance may be judged by a certain program's ability to meet certain objectives that contribute to a more abstract goal as calculated by that program's ability to use resources (or inputs) efficiently—by linking inputs to outputs—and/or effectively—by linking inputs to outcomes. A decision making—or allocation of scarce resources—problem is solved by determining which project maximizes efficiency and efficacy.
 Zero-based budgeting is a response to an incremental decision making process whereby the budget of a given fiscal year (FY) is largely decided upon by the existing budget of FY-1. In contrast to incrementalism, the allocation of scarce resources—funding—is determined from a zero-sum accounting method. In government, each function of a department's section proposes certain objectives that relate to some goal the section could achieve if allocated x dollars.
 Flexible Freeze is a budgeting approach pioneered by President George H. W. Bush as a means to cut government spending. Under this approach, certain programs would be affected by changes in population growth and inflation.
 Program Assessment Rating Tool (P.A.R.T.) is an instrument developed by the United States OMB to measure and assess the effectiveness of federal programs that review the program’s purpose and design, strategic planning, program management, and program results and accountability. The scores are rated from effective (ranging between 85 and 100 points), moderately affective (70-84 points), adequate (50-69 points), and ineffective (0-49 points).
 Priority Based Budgeting is a response to poor economic conditions.  As opposed to incremental budgeting, where resource allocation is determined based on marginal shifts in costs, priority based budgeting fixes the amount of governmental resources and then allocates resources across the various programs.  The programs receive their allocation based on their priority; priorities may include safe and secure communities, health, education, and community development among others.  Outcome assessment then determines the efficacy of the programs.  Although this approach is pro-democratic, critics suggest the administration of this process is extremely difficult.

Functions of a budget document
As a policy document, a government's budget is designed as a plan for implementing its policy.  Traditionally, budgets served as a more rigid tool to implement policy in a retrospective setting.  The functions associated with these values are listed under the Traditional Model and are control, management, and planning. The Modern Model, taking a less rigid approach, has replaced the control function with the monitoring function, the management function with the steering function, and the planning function with the strategic brokering function.

to the traditional control function, the monitoring function focuses on the consequences of expenditures.

Steering: as a response to the traditional management function, the steering function serves as a guide for managing.Strategic Brokering uses the budget document as a means of constantly looking for possible directions and reacting to the environment.

Values in budgeting
Three values are generally discussed in the literature of public budgeting: accountability, efficiency, and efficacy.

Accountability focuses on the inputs going into the system or program in action and is best characterized by the line-item budgeting approach.  It is best suited for the control and monitoring functions of a budget.

Efficiency focuses on the process of the system or program and its conversion of inputs (resources) into outputs (policy). Its focus on the process makes this value appropriate for performance budgets and most in-line with management and steering functions.

Efficacy focuses on outputs and outcomes, measuring the impact of policy.  This value follows both the program budget and PPBS budget approaches and coincides with the planning and strategic brokering functions.

Six steps of the budgetary process; simplified
Typically, the budget cycles occurs in four phases.  The first requires policy planning and resource analysis and includes revenue estimation.  The second phase is referred to as policy formulation and includes the negotiation and planning of the budget formation.  The third phase is policy execution which follows budget adoption is budget execution—the implementation and revision of budgeted policy.  The fourth phase encompasses the entire budget process, but is considered its fourth phase.  This phase is auditing and evaluating the entire process and system.  See the associated points below:

 Revenue Estimation performed in the executive branch by the finance director, clerk's office, budget director, manager, or a team.
 Budget Call issued to outline the presentation form, recommend certain goals.
 Budget Formulation reflecting on the past, set goals for the future and reconcile the difference.
 Budget Hearings can include departments, sections, the executive, and the public to discuss changes in the budget.
 Budget Adoption final approval by the legislative body.
 Budget Execution amending the budget as the fiscal year progresses.

Types of public budgets
 Operating budgets are those documents that describe the expenditures and revenues during a given period for the functioning of an organization.
 Capital budgeting is the process of planning for future purchases above a certain cost threshold or extended life span. This budget is typically accompanied by a capital improvement plan that describes a timeline for acquisition and payment of debt.

See also
 Budget
 Budget process
 Budget theory
 Constitutional economics
 Political economy

References

Public administration
Budgets